Demba Diallo (born 13 October 2000) is a Malian footballer who plays as a forward for Turkish club Manisa and the Mali national team.

International career
Diallo made his professional debut with the Mali national team in a 1–0 2020 African Nations Championship tie with Burkina Faso on 16 January 2021.

International goals
Scores and results list Mali's goal tally first.

References

External links
 
 

2000 births
People from Kayes
21st-century Malian people
Living people
Malian footballers
Mali A' international footballers
Mali international footballers
Association football forwards
Stade Malien players
Manisa FK footballers
Malian Première Division players
TFF First League players
2020 African Nations Championship players
Malian expatriate footballers
Expatriate footballers in Turkey
Malian expatriate sportspeople in Turkey